Ed Shaw may refer to:

 Ed Shaw (activist) (1923–1995), American socialist and member of the Socialist Workers Party
 Ed Shaw (American football) (1895–1964), American football player

See also
Edward Shaw (disambiguation)